Lava Lake is a lava dammed lake located in northwestern British Columbia, Canada. The lake lies within the Nisga'a Memorial Lava Beds Provincial Park, which includes fishing, hiking and other features.

Formation
Lava Lake increased in size and depth when lava from the Tseax Cone dammed the Tseax River in the 18th century. This is one of Canada's youngest lava flows.

See also
 Lava Lakes
List of lakes in Canada
Volcanism in Canada

References

Nass Country
Lava dammed lakes
Lakes of British Columbia
Cassiar Land District